A Four-member IHSAA-sanctioned conference currently spanning Daviess, Gibson, Greene, Knox, and Sullivan counties in Southwest and West Central Indiana. It was founded in 2004 as the Southwest Seven Conference, by teams in southwestern Indiana whose regular conferences do not play the sport. The conference lost a member in 2013, as Linton-Stockton pursued an independent schedule to better prepare themselves for the playoffs. The conference lost another in 2014, as Union (Dugger) was closed. Then lost Wood Memorial in 2018 after the school's football program was shuttered.

Membership

Former Members

Champions 

 Unofficial title, since a full conference schedule was not played. However, Linton-Stockton played a full conference schedule and finished 6–0.

Resources 
 AlmanacSports.com Southwest Seven Conference
 Southwest Seven Conference Standings

High school sports conferences and leagues in the United States
Indiana high school athletic conferences
Southwestern Indiana
Education in Daviess County, Indiana
Education in Gibson County, Indiana
Education in Greene County, Indiana
Education in Knox County, Indiana
Education in Sullivan County, Indiana